The 2011 HP Open was a tennis tournament played on outdoor hard courts. It was the third edition of the HP Open, and part of the WTA International tournaments of the 2011 WTA Tour. It was held at the Utsubo Tennis Center in Osaka, Japan, from October 10 through October 16, 2011.

WTA players

Seeds 

 Seeds are based on the rankings of October 3, 2011.

Other entrants
The following players received wildcards into the singles main draw:
  Marion Bartoli
  Aiko Nakamura
  Kurumi Nara

The following players received entry from the qualifying draw:

  Shuko Aoyama
  Noppawan Lertcheewakarn
  Erika Sema
  Yaroslava Shvedova

Champions

Singles

 Marion Bartoli def.  Samantha Stosur, 6–3, 6–1
 It was Bartoli' 2nd title of the year and the 7th of her career.

Doubles

 Kimiko Date-Krumm /  Zhang Shuai def.  Vania King /  Yaroslava Shvedova, 7–5, 3–6, [11–9]

External links

 
HP Open
2011
2011 in Japanese tennis